Elson Evelio Becerra Vaca (26 April 1978 – 8 January 2006) was a Colombian footballer.

Club career 
Born in Cartagena, Becerra began playing football with Deportes Tolima's youth academy. He joined the senior squad at age 17, helping the club gain promotion to the Colombian second division. He scored 64 goals for Tolima.

On club level the striker had played for Al Jazira in the United Arab Emirates since 2003. He played for Emirates Club during the 2005 season. He previously played for Deportes Tolima and Atlético Junior.

International career
A national team player, Becerra won the 2001 Copa America and participated in the 2003 Confederations Cup, where he became noted for trying to save the life of the collapsed Marc-Vivien Foé. He also featured in Colombia's unsuccessful qualification for the 2006 FIFA World Cup.

Death
Becerra was shot in a night club in his birth town Cartagena together with his friend Alexander Ríos, apparently after they had a fight with a group of men a couple of days earlier.

See also
List of unsolved murders

References

External links 
 

1978 births

2006 deaths
2001 Copa América players
2003 FIFA Confederations Cup players
Al Jazira Club players
América de Cali footballers
Association football wingers
Atlético Junior footballers
Categoría Primera A players
Colombian footballers
Colombia international footballers
Colombian murder victims
Copa América-winning players
Deaths by firearm in Colombia
Deportes Tolima footballers
Emirates Club players
Male murder victims
People murdered in Colombia
Sportspeople from Cartagena, Colombia
UAE Pro League players
Unsolved murders in South America